The 3rd Jebtsundamba Khutughtu (1758-1773), was the third incarnation of the Jebtsundamba Khutuktu, the spiritual heads of the Gelug lineage of Tibetan Buddhism in Outer Mongolia. His personal name was Ishdambiynyam and his Tibetan ceremonial name Ye-shes-bstan-pa'i-nyi-ma.

Biography 
He came from Tibet and was chosen as the third incarnation after the death of the 2nd Jebtsundamba Khutughtu.

The second Jebtsundamba was a member of Mongolia's highest nobility and direct descendant of Genghis Khan. After Chingünjav's rebellion and the successive demise of the second Jebtsundamba Khutugtu, the Qianlong Emperor decreed in 1758 that all future reincarnations were to be found from among the population of Tibet, making the third incarnation the first one from there.

1758 births
1773 deaths
Jebtsundamba Khutuktus
Qing dynasty Tibetan Buddhists